Mustafa Shameel (July 3, 1941 – May 13, 2013) was a Pakistani scientist and educator noted for his work in the fields of barobiology, phycochemistry and taxonomy of algae. He spent most of his five decades' academic career at the University of Karachi.

Early life and education 

Mustafa Shameel was born on 3 July 1941, as Syed Mustafa Shameel Quadri, to a family of Syed Amirul Hassan Quadri and Mohammadi Begum in Rudauli, Uttar Pradesh, British India. He earned his MSc degree in botany from the University of Karachi in 1962 and Dr. rer. nat. in marine botany from the University of Kiel in 1972 under DAAD Scholarship in Bonn, Germany. In 1977 he finished his 14 months' postdoctoral research from the same university under Alexander von Humboldt Fellowship.

In 1965 Mustafa Shameel also earned his MSc degree in homoeopathy from the International Medical College Lahore, but he did not practice it.

Career 

Mustafa Shameel started his academic career as a lecturer at the department of botany, University of Karachi, in 1962. In 1972, upon receiving his PhD from Kiel University, he progressed to assistant professor, to associate professor in 1978, professor in 1985, meritorious professor in 1999, and eminent professor (HEC) in 2003.

From December 1977 to July 1978 he worked as Assistant Professor of the Department of Botany at El-Fateh University in Tripoli, Libya.

From 1994 to 1998 he served as a director of the Institute of Marine Science, and from 1999 to 2001 as a director of the Centre of Excellence in Marine Biology at the University of Karachi. Also, from 1994 to 2008 he worked as Honorary Professor of the Department of Botany, Federal Urdu University of Arts, Science & Technology, Karachi, Pakistan.

In 2001-2003 Shameel was the President of Pakistan Botanical Society. In 2005 he was elected a Fellow of Pakistan Academy of Sciences, and a Fellow of The Academy of Sciences for the Developing World, Trieste, Italy, in 2008.

Throughout his career, he was an academic advisor to 17 doctoral students.

Scientific contributions 

In his early publications, Mustafa Shameel pioneered the research on barobiology of seaweeds, the effects of high hydrostatic pressure on the marine algae.

In 1990 he developed a new concept of phycochemistry, the study of natural products and chemical constituents occurring within algal thallus. In 2005 he founded “International Journal of Phycology and Phycochemistry”. 

Mustafa Shameel described 28 new taxa of marine algae; extracted and described 24 new chemical compounds such as sterols, terpenes, and glycosides from the seaweeds.

In 2001, in his work “An approach to the classification of algae in the new millennium” Shameel proposed a new classification of algae by creating 22 new taxonomic groups. He later developed and modified it in 2008 and 2012. Shameelian classification of algae is now used in all the major universities of Pakistan.

Seven new species of algae were named after him (Ulothrix shameelii, Scinaia shameelii, Stypopodium shameelii, Codium shameelii, Ceratium shameelii, Spatoglossum shameelii, and Balliella shameelii).

Shameel served on editorial boards of Pakistan Journal of Botany, Pakistan Journal of Marine Sciences, Marine Research journal, Biological Research Journal, Journal of Natural History & Wildlife, and FUUAST Journal of Biology. He also served as editor-in-chief of Pakistan Journal of Marine Biology in 1999–2001, and of International Journal of Phycology & Phycochemistry in 2005–2010.

Awards and recognition 

In recognition of his work, Prof Shameel was awarded the Presidential Awards Izaz-I-Fazeelat in 2000 and Tamgha-e-Imtiaz in 2001.

Every year since 2014 his students organize a workshop and a seminar in his name at the University of Karachi.

Death 

Mustafa Shameel died on 13 May 2013 at his residence in Karachi. He is survived by his wife, Dr. Suraiya Shameel, adjunct professor, Department of Urdu, University of Karachi and two daughters, Dr. Simin Khaliq and Dr. Naushin Fahad.

Publications 

Mustafa Shameel authored more than 330 scientific publications and 8 books. He also wrote poetry, especially for children.

Selected publications

Books

References 

Pakistani phycologists
Pakistani marine biologists
Pakistani botanists
1941 births
2013 deaths